José Ángel Montero (born Caracas October 2, 1832 - died Caracas August 24, 1881) was a Venezuelan opera composer, a contemporary of the Brazilian Carlos Gomes.  As maestro di capilla at the cathedral of Caracas he wrote religious music; he also composed a number of zarzuelas and, in 1873, the opera Virginia, to an Italian-language libretto.

Works 
Doña Inés or la Política en el Hogar, 1862.
La modista (zarzuela in two acts, 1864).
Fabio o Estela or el casamiento por Dote, 1865.
La curiosidad de las Mujeres or El Huésped enamorado, 1865.
Los Alemanes en Italia, 1866.
Colegialas con colegialas (zarzuela in two acts), 1868.
La Castañera, 1868.
El Charlatán Mudo, 1873.
Diamira, 1873.
Virginia, 1873.
Tragedia Lírica, 1873.
Atrás or el Centinela.
Un baile en Caracas or el Cumpleaños de Leonor (zarzuela in one act), 1865.
La ardilla (zarzuela in one act).
La inocente Serranilla (zarzuela in one act).
La gallina Ciega  (Overture zarzuela)

See also 
Venezuelan music
Virginia

External links
 

1832 births
1881 deaths
People from Caracas
Venezuelan classical composers
Venezuelan opera composers
19th-century classical composers
Male classical composers
19th-century male musicians